Chimes is an unincorporated community in Van Buren County, Arkansas, United States.

The origin of the name "Chimes" is obscure.

References

Unincorporated communities in Van Buren County, Arkansas
Unincorporated communities in Arkansas